Molybdite is the naturally occurring mineral form of molybdenum trioxide MoO3. It occurs as yellow to greenish needles and crystallizes in the orthorhombic crystal system.

Discovery and occurrence 
Molybdite was first described in 1854 for and occurrence in quartz veins in the Knöttel area of Krupka, Krušné Hory Mountains in the Ústí Region of Bohemia, Czech Republic. It occurs in vein cavities and as coatings in molybdenite ore veins and quartz topaz greisens. Associated minerals include molybdenite, betpakdalite and quartz. The similar mineral ferrimolybdite is often misidentified as molybdite.

References 

Molybdenum minerals
Oxide minerals
Orthorhombic minerals
Minerals in space group 62